Archie is a masculine given name. It may also refer to:

Places
 Archie, Michigan, a ghost town in the United States
 Archie, Missouri, a city in the United States
 Rural Municipality of Archie, a former municipality in Manitoba, Canada

Arts, entertainment, and media
 Archie Comics, a comic book publisher
 Archie (comic book), a series featuring the character Archie Andrews
 Archie (comic strip)
 Archie, a 1964 TV comedy film directed by Gene Nelson
 Archie: To Riverdale and Back Again, a 1990 TV film

Computing and technology
 Archie (Linux), a version of Arch Linux
 Archie (robot), a humanoid robot
 Archie, informal term for the Acorn Archimedes computer
 Archie search engine, a search engine for FTP sites

Science
 Archie (squid), a giant squid preserved in the Natural History Museum in London
 Archie (meteorite), a meteorite which fell in Missouri, United States in 1932

Surname
 Dominique Archie (born 1987), American professional basketball player
 George Archie (1914–2001), American baseball player
 Ivor Archie, Chief Justice of Trinidad and Tobago (as of 2008), former Solicitor General and Attorney General of the Cayman Islands

Other uses
 Anti-aircraft fire, referred to as "archie" by the British Royal Flying Corps and Royal Air Force

See also
 Archie's law, in petrophysics
 Archy (disambiguation)